Michael Kesselring (born January 13, 2000) is an American professional ice hockey defenseman currently playing for the Tucson Roadrunners in the American Hockey League (AHL) as a prospect to the Arizona Coyotes of the National Hockey League (NHL). He was selected 164th overall by the Edmonton Oilers in the 2018 NHL Entry Draft.

Playing career 
Kesselring played high school hockey with New Hampton School within the New England Preparatory School Athletic Council before spending the conclusion of the 2017–18 season with the Des Moines Buccaneers of the United States Hockey League (USHL). In his first year of draft eligibility, with standout physical attributes and strong hockey sense, Kesselring was selected by the Edmonton Oilers in the sixth-round, 164th overall, of the 2018 NHL Entry Draft.

In his only full season in the USHL in 2018–19, Kesselring split the season between the Buccaneers and the Fargo Force before committing to a collegiate career with Northeastern University of the Hockey East.

During his sophomore season in the NCAA, Kesselring opted to conclude his collegiate career and turn professional for the remainder of the 2020–21 season in signing a three-year, entry-level contract with the Edmonton Oilers on March 22, 2021. Appearing with AHL affiliate, the Bakersfield Condors, on an amateur tryout basis, Kesselring collected 3 points through 21 regular season games and making 6 post-season appearances.

In his first full professional season in 2021–22, Kesselring established himself on the Condors blueline, registering 2 goals and 13 points through 55 regular season games.

Approaching the NHL trade deadline, Kesselring was traded by the Oilers along with a 2023 third-round pick to the Arizona Coyotes in exchange for Nick Bjugstad and Cam Dineen on March 2, 2023. He was immediately recalled by the Coyotes and made his NHL debut the following day in a 6–1 defeat to the Carolina Hurricanes at Mullett Arena. He was reassigned the following day to the Coyotes AHL affiliate, the Tucson Roadrunners, on March 4, 2023.

Personal
Kesselring's father, Casey Kesselring, played professional hockey at the ECHL level and has served as junior head coach since 2003. Michael was coached by his father during his high school tenure with New Hampton School. His younger brother, Mason, currently plays junior hockey with the Chilliwack Chiefs in the British Columbia Hockey League (BCHL).

Career statistics

References

External links
 

2000 births
Living people
American ice hockey defensemen
Arizona Coyotes players
Bakersfield Condors players
Des Moines Buccaneers players
Edmonton Oilers draft picks
Fargo Force players
Northeastern Huskies men's ice hockey players
Tucson Roadrunners players